The following radio stations broadcast on FM frequency 104.1 MHz:

Argentina
 Cóndor in Laguna Paiva, Santa Fe
 Frecuencia Mutual in Rosario, Santa Fe
 LRM417 in Venado Tuerto, Santa Fe
 LRM947 in Calchaqui, Santa Fe
 Radio María in Mercedes, Corrientes
 Radio Valle Viejo in San Isidro, Catamarca

Australia
 104.1 Territory FM in Darwin, Northern Territory
 2CHY in Coffs Harbour, New South Wales
 2DAY in Sydney, New South Wales
 ABC Classic in Mount Gambier, South Australia
 ABC Classic in Wodonga, Victoria
 Radio TAB in Charleville, Queensland
 Triple J in Mount Isa, Queensland
 Triple J in Woomera, South Australia
 6PNN in Karratha, Western Australia

Canada (Channel 281)
 CBGA-14-FM in Grande-Vallee, Quebec
 CBYO-FM in Barriere, British Columbia
 CFOI-FM in Quebec City, Quebec
 CFQX-FM in Selkirk, Manitoba
 CFZY-FM in Stockholm, Saskatchewan
 CFZZ-FM in St-Jean-sur-Richelieu, Quebec
 CHAD-FM in Dawson Creek, British Columbia
 CHRT-FM in Trail, British Columbia
 CHYK-FM in Timmins, Ontario
 CICZ-FM in Midland, Ontario
 CIFA-FM in Yarmouth, Nova Scotia
 CIOT-FM in Nipawin, Saskatchewan
 CIRA-FM-4 in Rimouski, Quebec
 CIRN-FM in Saskatoon, Saskatchewan
 CITU-FM in Petit-de-Grat, Nova Scotia
 CJCJ-FM in Woodstock, New Brunswick
 CKBF-FM in Suffield, Alberta
 CKFF-FM in Kipawa, Quebec 
 CKNA-FM in Natashquan, Quebec
 CKTF-FM in Gatineau, Quebec
 VF2221 in Valemount, British Columbia
 VF2452 in Voisey Bay, Newfoundland and Labrador
 VF2526 in Nakusp, British Columbia

Cayman Islands
ZFKH-FM at Grand Cayman

China 
 CNR Business Radio in Qingdao

Ireland
Shannonside FM in counties Longford and Roscommon

Jamaica
BBC World Service

Malaysia
 Best FM in Johor Bahru and Singapore
 Pahang FM in Eastern Pahang and Klang Valley
 Perak FM in Northern Perak

Mexico
 XEDF-FM in Mexico City
 XHADA-FM in Ensenada, Baja California
 XHBA-FM in Mexicali, Baja California
 XHCCG-FM in Monclova, Coahuila
 XHCDH-FM in Ciudad Cuauhtémoc, Chihuahua
 XHECQ-FM in Culiacán, Sinaloa
 XHGR-FM in Xalapa, Veracruz
 XHMD-FM in León, Guanajuato
 XHPEP-FM in Teposcolula, Oaxaca
 XHRPV-FM in Ciudad Victoria (Benito Juárez), Tamaulipas
 XHSJR-FM in San Juan del Río, Querétaro
 XHTEN-FM in Tepic, Nayarit
 XHUACS-FM in Saltillo, Coahuila
 XHVT-FM in Villahermosa, Tabasco

United Kingdom
 BBC Radio Shropshire in Clun
 BBC Radio Sheffield in South Yorkshire
 BBC Radio Stoke in Stafford
 BBC Radio Berkshire in Basingstoke
 BBC Radio Cumbria in Keswick
 BBC Radio 4 in Dumbarton
 BBC Radio Cymru in Cwmavon, Torfaen
 BBC Radio nan Gàidheal in Edinburgh

United States (Channel 281)
 KAFE in Bellingham, Washington
 KANT (FM) in Guernsey, Wyoming
 KBEJ-LP in Beaumont, Texas
 KBFM in Edinburg, Texas
  in Pelican Rapids, Minnesota
  in Lompoc, California
 KBRI in Clarendon, Arkansas
  in Anchorage, Alaska
  in Buena Vista, Colorado
  in Carlsbad, New Mexico
 KCGK in Lutesville, Missouri
  in Powell, Wyoming
 KCKB in Moran, Texas
 KCNF-LP in Macon, Missouri
 KCUN-LP in Livingston, Texas
 KEJC-LP in Dallas, Texas
 KENA-FM in Hatfield, Arkansas
  in Scappoose, Oregon
 KFLT-FM in Tucson, Arizona
 KFMU-FM in Oak Creek, Colorado
  in Woodlake, California
  in Fredonia, Kansas
 KHCI-LP in Moberly, Missouri
  in Modesto, California
 KIBZ in Crete, Nebraska
 KIHW-LP in West Helena, Arkansas
  in Rapid City, South Dakota
 KJLO-FM in Monroe, Louisiana
  in Windsor, California
 KJPZ in East Helena, Montana
 KKLM in Murrieta, California
 KKUS in Tyler, Texas
 KLCJ in Oak Grove, Louisiana
 KLEJ-LP in Fort Worth, Texas
 KLXN in Rosepine, Louisiana
  in Oklahoma City, Oklahoma
 KMSN in Mason, Texas
 KNAB-FM in Burlington, Colorado
 KOEZ in Ames, Iowa
  in American Falls, Idaho
 KOWO-LP in Wimberley, Texas
 KPOC-FM in Pocahontas, Arkansas
 KPPQ-LP in Ventura, California
 KQFA-LP in Lafayette, Louisiana
 KRBE in Houston, Texas
 KRDS in Silverton, Colorado
 KRWJ-LP in Rockwall, Texas
 KSAF-LP in Minot, North Dakota
 KSAH-FM in Pearsall, Texas
 KSDM in International Falls, Minnesota
  in Ash Grove, Missouri
 KTCG in Sanger, Texas
  in Santa Fe, New Mexico
 KUEZ in Fallon, Nevada
 KVDU in Houma, Louisiana
 KWOW in Clifton, Texas
  in Sisters, Oregon
 KXDD in Yakima, Washington
 KYRE-LP in Mansfield, Texas
 KZGP-LP in Grand Prairie, Texas
 KZJK in Saint Louis Park, Minnesota
 KZTW in Tioga, North Dakota
 KZYN in Toquerville, Utah
 W281BE in Fort Mill, South Carolina
  in Allentown, Pennsylvania
 WALR-FM in Palmetto, Georgia
  in Le Roy, Illinois
  in Campbellsville, Kentucky
 WCLE-FM in Calhoun, Tennessee
  in Kill Devil Hills, North Carolina
 WCYI-LP in Bloomington, Indiana
 WDLT-FM in Saraland, Alabama
 WDYO-LP in Nashville, Tennessee
 WEPV-LP in Hampton, Virginia
  in Vega Alta, Puerto Rico
  in Tallahassee, Florida
 WGVC-LP in Gainesville, Florida
  in Hazelwood, Missouri
 WHRZ-LP in Spartanburg, South Carolina
  in Buffalo, New York
 WIKY-FM in Evansville, Indiana
 WIOF-LP in Woodstock, New York
 WJFY-LP in Newark, Ohio
 WJNN-LP in Fallsburg, New York
  in Swansboro, North Carolina
  in Muncie, Indiana
 WMJA-LP in Loudon, Tennessee
 WMNV in Rupert, Vermont
  in Colchester, Illinois
  in Waterbury, Connecticut
  in Yankton, South Dakota
 WNCC in Franklin, North Carolina
 WNHC-LP in Lima, Ohio
  in Harrisburg, Pennsylvania
  in Jackson, Tennessee
 WOVE-LP in Forest City, North Carolina
  in Waldorf, Maryland
  in Punxsutawney, Pennsylvania
 WPYK in Portsmouth, Ohio
 WQAL in Cleveland, Ohio
 WQOU-LP in Mt. Gilead, Ohio
  in Reidsville, Georgia
  in Brunswick, Georgia
  in Algoma, Wisconsin
  in Linwood, Michigan
  in Cocoa Beach, Florida
  in Winston-Salem, North Carolina
 WUCZ in Carthage, Tennessee
 WVGR in Grand Rapids, Michigan
 WVIW in Bridgeport, West Virginia
 WVXS in Romney, West Virginia
 WWBX in Boston, Massachusetts
 WWUS in Big Pine Key, Florida
 WWYL in Chenango Bridge, New York
 WXRW-LP in Milwaukee, Wisconsin
 WXVM in Merrill, Wisconsin
  in Myrtle Beach, South Carolina
 WYDX-LP in Frankfort, Kentucky
  in Madison, Wisconsin
 WZIG-LP in Palm Harbor, Florida
  in Union, Mississippi

References

Lists of radio stations by frequency